Richmond County is a county located on the Northern Neck in the U.S. state of Virginia. As of the 2020 census, the population sits at 8,923. Its county seat is Warsaw. The rural county should not be confused with the large city and state capital Richmond, Virginia.  It was formed in 1692 when the first Rappahannock County was divided to form Richmond County and Essex County.

Geography

Adjacent counties
 Westmoreland County, Virginia – north
 Northumberland County, Virginia – east
 Lancaster County, Virginia – southeast
 Essex County, Virginia – southwest

National protected area
 Rappahannock River Valley National Wildlife Refuge (part) Franklin, Island Farm, Laurel Grove, Peter, Tayloe, Wellford, Wilna, Wright units; Menokin, Wellford easements

Major highways

Demographics

2020 census

Note: the US Census treats Hispanic/Latino as an ethnic category. This table excludes Latinos from the racial categories and assigns them to a separate category. Hispanics/Latinos can be of any race.

2000 Census

As of the census of 2000, there were 8809 people, 2,937 households, and 2,000 families residing in the county.  The population density was 46 people per square mile (18/km2).  There were 3,512 housing units at an average density of 18 per square mile (7/km2).  The racial makeup of the county was 64.77% White, 33.17% Black or African American, 0.09% Native American, 0.32% Asian, 0.07% Pacific Islander, 0.85% from other races, and 0.73% from two or more races.  2.10% of the population were Hispanic or Latino of any race.

There were 2,937 households, out of which 27.20% had children under the age of 18 living with them, 52.30% were married couples living together, 11.80% had a female householder with no husband present, and 31.90% were non-families. 28.30% of all households were made up of individuals, and 14.20% had someone living alone who was 65 years of age or older.  The average household size was 2.40 and the average family size was 2.93.

In the county, the population was spread out, with 18.40% under the age of 18, 8.00% from 18 to 24, 31.80% from 25 to 44, 24.10% from 45 to 64, and 17.70% who were 65 years of age or older.  The median age was 40 years. For every 100 females there were 127.60 males.  For every 100 females age 18 and over, there were 131.90 males.

The median income for a household in the county was $33,026, and the median income for a family was $42,143. Males had a median income of $30,722 versus $21,807 for females. The per capita income for the county was $16,675.  About 11.90% of families and 15.40% of the population were below the poverty line, including 21.20% of those under age 18 and 12.50% of those age 65 or over.

In 2004 the Menokin Bluegrass Festival (later changed to Menokin Music Festival) was launched in Richmond County at the ruins of Francis Lightfoot Lee's (a signer of the Declaration of Independence) ancestral home, Menokin.  The festival attracts thousands of music fans every year in a celebration of the Northern Neck's historical legacy.

Government 
Supervisors of Richmond County (2022) are:

 Richard E. Thomas Sr. (District 1, Vice Chair)
 John David Parr (District 2)
 William C. Herbert, II (District 3)
 Robert B. Pemberton (District 4)
 F. Lee Sanders (District 5, Chair)

The County Administrator is R. Morgan Quicke.

Education 
Richmond County Public Schools operates 2 public school campuses with about 1300 total students enrolled. Richmond County Elementary / Middle School serves grades K-7, and Rappahannock High School serves grades 8-12. The current Superintendent (2022) is Dr. Bernard S. "Trey" Davis III.

Communities

Town
 Warsaw

Unincorporated communities
 Farnham
 Foneswood
 Haynesville
 Lyells
 Sharps
 Village
 Newland

Germans Corner another locality name in the county.  It is about 1.5 miles north of Naylors Beach, at the junction of Virginia State Route 636 and Virginia State Route 624.  It is named from Wilber L. Jerman, who built a large dwelling at the location in 1923, and lived there until 1946. Jerman's wife Cleva May was deeded 50 acres extending from the south and west of the corner from her father in 1920. Over time the original "Jerman's Corner" has come to be misspelled and known as "German's Corner."

Politics

See also
 National Register of Historic Places listings in Richmond County, Virginia

References

External links
 Menokin Bluegrass Festival

 
Virginia counties
1692 establishments in Virginia
Northern Neck
Populated places established in 1692